The Brahman is an American breed of zebuine-taurine hybrid beef cattle. It was bred in the United States from 1885 from cattle originating in India, imported at various times from the United Kingdom, from India and from Brazil. These were mainly Gir, Guzerá and Nelore stock, with some Indu-Brasil, Krishna Valley and Ongole. The Brahman has a high tolerance of heat, sunlight and humidity, and good resistance to parasites. It has been exported to many countries, particularly in the tropics; in Australia it is the most numerous breed of cattle. It has been used in the creation of numerous taurine-indicine hybrids, some of which – such as the Brangus and Brahmousin – are established as separate breeds.

History 

Zebuine (Asian humped) cattle were present in the United States from 1849, when a single bull of Indian origin was imported from the United Kingdom to South Carolina. Cross-breeding of these with local taurine cows was the first step in the creation of the Brahman breed. Other small groups of Indian cattle were imported up to about 1906, mostly to Texas; some of them were imported to be displayed as circus animals, and were later sold to ranchers. In 1924 and 1925 larger numbers of Brazilian cattle were brought to the United States through Mexico. These were mainly zebuine-taurine hybrid Guzerá, but also included some Gir and Nelore; there were 210 bulls and 18 cows in total.

A breed association, the American Brahman Breeders Association, was formed in 1924, and a herd-book was started. The name "Brahman" was chosen by J. W. Sartwelle, secretary of the association. In 1939 the herd-book was closed, thereafter recording only the offspring of registered parents. The registration in 1946 of eighteen imported Brazilian bulls, mainly Indu-Brasil and Gir, was permitted, as were some later additions of imported stock. The association registered all American indicine cattle in the same herd-book until 1991, when herd-books for Gir, Guzerat, Indu-Brasil, Nelore and Tabapua were separated from that for the American Red and Grey Brahman.

Exports of cattle of this breed to Australia began in 1933 and continued until 1954, and amounted to 49 head in all; by 1973 their offspring numbered more than 225,000. Some further imports, totalling about 700 head, took place after 1981.  By 1987 there were over a million in Queensland alone, and by the end of the century there were more of them in Australia than of any other breed, particularly in the tropical north of the country.

Characteristics 

The Brahman has good tolerance of heat and is widespread in tropical regions. It is resistant to insects thanks to its thick skin. Brahman cattle live longer than many other breeds, often producing calves at ages 15 and older.

Use 

The Brahman is reared for the meat industry, particularly in areas where good resistance to hot or tropical conditions is needed. As with other zebuine cattle, the meat is of lower quality than that of specialised European beef cattle breeds. For this reason it is commonly cross-bred with cattle of those breeds, either by raising hybrid calves born to pure-bred parents, or by creating a composite or hybrid breed, of which there are many. Some of them, such as the Brahmousin (Brahman x Limousin), Brangus (Brahman x Angus) and Simbrah (Brahman x Simmental) have acquired breed status in their own right, but many others have not. These include the Brahorn (Brahman x Shorthorn), the Bravon (Brahman x Devon) and South Bravon (Brahman x South Devon), the Bra-Swiss (Brahman x Brown Swiss), the Sabre (Brahman x Sussex) and the Braford (Brahman x Hereford).

In Oman and Fujairah, Brahman bulls are used in the traditional sport of bull-butting; they may be fed milk and honey to prepare them for the contest.

Gallery

References

Cattle breeds originating in the United States
Cattle breeds